Philip Alongi is an American news producer and opera singer. He is the Executive Producer of NJTV News and has received eighteen Emmy Award nominations. As a singer, he has performed in several dozen operas for US opera companies.

Early life
Alongi graduated from the Mason Gross School of the Arts at Rutgers University. He was originally a rock singer in a band called Philip's Head, before taking up opera, which he studied at Rutgers. He is the son of television producer Phil Alongi, Sr.

Television
In 1997 Alongi joined NBC News, where he produced for Nightly News, The Today Show, and NBC News at Sunrise. In 2011 he later became the executive producer of NJTV News. In 2016 he was also named to the forty under forty list of NJBIZ. In 2017 Alongi became the director of program development at NJTV. In 2017 Alongi also served as the executive producer to I Can't... I Have Rehearsal, a documentary about high school musical theatre programs that was broadcast on NJTV. That year he was elected to the Board of Governors for the New York Chapter of the National Academy of Television Arts and Sciences. Alongi has received eighteen nominations for New York regional Emmy Awards himself for his producer work at NJTV as well as Mid-Atlantic Chapter Emmy Awards.

Opera
Alongi is an operatic tenor and sings opera with professional companies in the US. Roles he has played include Luigi in Il Tabarro, Radames in Aida, Don Jose in Carmen, Cavaradossi in Tosca, Alfredo in La Traviata, and Canio in Pagliacci. In addition to performing in a few dozen operas, he has twice performed opera on The Today Show, and sang at the funeral mass of Tim Russert as well as at Russert’s memorial service at the Kennedy Center for the Performing Arts in Washington, D.C. Alongi also performed at both the 2008 and 2012 Republican National Conventions, as well as the 2008 Democratic Presidential Primary Debate at Florida Atlantic University.

References

Living people
American operatic tenors
American television producers
NBC News people
Year of birth missing (living people)
Mason Gross School of the Arts alumni
21st-century American opera singers
21st-century American male singers
21st-century American singers